Taroko may refer to:

Taroko people, indigenous people of Taiwan
Taroko language, language of the Taroko people
Taroko Mountain, mountain in Taiwan
Taroko National Park, national park in Taiwan
Taroko Park, amusement park and shopping center in Kaohsiung, Taiwan
Taroko Express, express train service of the Taiwan Railways Administration
Taroko Bus, bus company serving northern Hualien County, Taiwan